Matteo Aloisio Niedhammer y Yaeckle O.F.M. Cap. (September 11, 1901 - June 25, 1970) was a Roman Catholic bishop.

Born in New York City, New York, United States, Niedhammer y Yaeckle was ordained to the priesthood on June 8, 1927. On May 11, 1943, he was appointed titular bishop of Caloe and bishop of the Vicariate Apostolic of Bluefields, Nicaragua and was ordained bishop on June 29, 1943. He died in 1970 while still in office.

Notes

1901 births
1970 deaths
Religious leaders from New York City
20th-century Roman Catholic titular bishops
20th-century Roman Catholic bishops in Nicaragua
Capuchin bishops
Roman Catholic bishops of Bluefields